Abegg is a German surname. Notable people with the surname include:

 Bruno Erhard Abegg (1803–1848), Prussian statesman
 Elisabeth Abegg (1882-1974), German educator and resistance fighter
 Jemina Pearl Abegg (born 1987), American rock singer
 Jimmy Abegg (born 1954), American musical and visual artist
 Johann Friedrich Abegg (1765–1840), German theologian
 Julius Friedrich Heinrich Abegg (1796–1868), German criminalist
 Marisa Abegg (born 1987), American soccer player
 Richard Abegg (1869–1910), German chemist

German-language surnames

de:Abegg